"Promised Land" is a 1987 single by American producer and DJ Joe Smooth, featuring Anthony Thomas and is one of the most widely acclaimed house classics.

Background and release
Smooth got the idea for "Promised Land" while he was on tour in Europe with Farley "Jackmaster" Funk. He saw how well house music was received in Europe and wrote "Promised Land" with inspiration from classic Motown songs. He was determined to write a classic song with the same type of spirit. Smooth gained international acclaim with the release of the track. It spoke of how humans, as brothers and sisters, should unite in love and thrive in paradise. Dance music was very popular in the underground culture in Chicago at that time and "Promised Land" became a big club-hit. Originally released in 1987, it peaked at #56 in the UK Singles Chart in February 1989 following the Top 40 success of a cover version by The Style Council. It has been covered several times since its release.

In October 2004, "Promised Land" appeared in the video game Grand Theft Auto: San Andreas.  Within the game, the song could be heard playing on the fictional House Music radio station SF-UR.

Impact and legacy
In 1995, British DJ Graham Gold picked "Promised Land" as one of his favourite songs, saying, "I got it in '89 when I wasn't known for playing house. It's one of those wicked emotional records where the lyrical and musical content is so uplifting that you never get tired of hearing it." Also British hardhouse and trance music record producer Jon the Dentist chose it as one of his favourites same year, adding, "It's got uplifting vocals. I hate singing but I'm always singing along when I play it. I'm sure people are thinking, who's that prat in the DJ box. It's what deep house should be all about."

In 1996, Mixmag ranked the song number 20 in its "100 Greatest Dance Singles Of All Time" list, adding, "There's Someday and Strings of Life and Chime and Keep On Moving, but the one record that, for me, sums up the excitement of that period of music more than any other is the incredible spiritual burst of optimism that is Joe Smooth's Promised Land."

In 1998, DJ Magazine ranked it number 4 in their list of "Top 100 Club Tunes".

In 2018, Mixmag listed it as one of "The 30 best vocal house anthems ever".

Track listing
 12", US (1987)
"Promised Land" (Club Mix)	
"Promised Land" (Underground Mix)	
"Promised Land" (Radio Mix)

 7" single, UK (1988)
"Promised Land" (Radio Mix)	
"Promised Land" (Underground Mix)

 12", West Germany (1988)
"Promised Land" (Club Mix) – 5:07
"Promised Land" (Underground Mix) – 4:10
"Promised Land" (Freestyle Mix) – 5:07

 12" single, UK (1988)
"Promised Land" (Club Mix) – 5:08
"Promised Land" (Underground Mix) – 4:11
"Promised Land" (Freestyle Mix) – 5:10

Charts

Cover versions, samples and remixes
The Style Council released a cover of the song in 1989.  Along with the track, "Can You Still Love Me", "Promised Land" was the group's only entry on the US dance chart, where it peaked at number nineteen.

References

1987 songs
1987 debut singles
1989 singles
Deep house songs
The Style Council songs